Federal Route 153, or Jalan Batu Belah Batu Bertangkup, is a major federal road in Langkawi Island, Kedah, Malaysia. One of the famous attraction is "Batu Belah Batu Bertangkup" or a Split Boulder.

Features

At most sections, the Federal Route 153 was built under the JKR R5 road standard, allowing maximum speed limit of up to 90 km/h.

List of junctions and town

References

Malaysian Federal Roads
Roads in Langkawi